Bernhard H. Bayerlein (born 1949, in Wiesbaden, Hesse) is a German professor, historian and honorary senior researcher at the Ruhr-University Bochum. His work includes the study of transnational communism, the history of social, political and cultural movements, and of the labour movement, as well as Portuguese and Spanish studies and comparative politics, including semi-presidentialism.

References

External links

 Academia.edu profile
 Personal website 

1949 births
People from Wiesbaden
Academic staff of Ruhr University Bochum
Living people
Ruhr University Bochum alumni